This article lists the confirmed squads for the 2005 Women's FIH Hockey Junior World Cup tournament held in Santiago, Chile, between 14 and 25 September 2005.

Pool A

England
Head coach: Karen Brown

Emily Cotterill (GK)
Kirsty Mackay (GK)
Harriet Cunningham
Natalie Seymour
Alex Danson
Ashleigh Ball
Hannah MacLeod (C)
Crista Cullen
Laura Price
Beckie Herbert
Chloe Rogers
Charlotte Hartley
Kerry Williams
Julie Hope
Natasha Brennan
Lyndsay French
Gemma Darrington 
Hayley Brown

Netherlands
Head coach: Robbert Aalbregt

Charlotte van der Hulst (GK)
Maartje Goderie
Mignonne Meekels
Carlien Dirkse van den Heuvel
Pauline Brugts
Renske van Geel
Maartje Paumen
Maruschka van Soest
Eva Bots
Jolanda Plijter
Karin den Ouden
Maureen van Hamel (GK)
Alessia Padalino
Nienke Kremers
Mirjam Sijtsma
Vera Vorstenbosch (C)
Sophie Polkamp 
Tessa de Haas

United States
Head coach: Tracey Fuchs

Lauren Ehrlichman (GK)
Katie Evans
<li value=3>Lori Hillman
<li value=5>Jamie Montgomery
<li value=6>Katie O'Donnell
<li value=7>Katie Grant
<li value=8>Cara-Lynn Lopresti
<li value=9>Mia Link
<li value=11>Michelle Kasold
<li value=14>Katelyn Falgowski
<li value=15>Amy Stopford
<li value=16>Brianna O'Donnell
<li value=17>Lauren Crandall
<li value=22>Rachel Dawson ([[Captain (sports)|C]])
<li value=23>Lauren Crowley
<li value=28>Heather Schnepf
<li value=29>Laree Beans 
<li value=31>Katherine Blair (GK)

Zimbabwe
Head coach: Eddie Chiringa

<li value=1>Sarah Bennett
<li value=2>Stephanie Mazingi (GK)
<li value=3>Rudo Mawema
<li value=4>Amy-Lee Levey
<li value=5>Danielle Pycroft
<li value=6>Belinda Mannix
<li value=7>Faith Musengezi
<li value=8>Sarah Blythe-Wood
<li value=9>Jenna Palmer ([[Captain (sports)|C]])
<li value=10>Tatenda Chikumbirike
<li value=11>Jacquelin Kataneksza
<li value=12>Pauline Ndlovu
<li value=13>Mutsawashe Mutembwa
<li value=14>Ruth Fraser
<li value=15>Chantelle Zietsman
<li value=16>Stacy Logan
<li value=17>Robyn Williams 
<li value=18>Kundayi Mawema (GK)

Pool B

Canada
Head coach: Hash Kanjee

<li value=1>Danielle Wilson (GK)
<li value=2>Amanda Stone (GK)
<li value=3>Robyn Evans
<li value=5>Ali Lee
<li value=6>Thea Culley
<li value=7>Lelia Sacre
<li value=8>Mary Glen
<li value=9>Katie Rushton
<li value=11>Tiffany Michaluk
<li value=12>Emma Carbery
<li value=14>Katie Baker
<li value=15>Hilary Linton
<li value=16>Megan Anderson
<li value=17>Robyn Pendleton
<li value=19>Tyla Flexman
<li value=19>Karen Mass
<li value=21>Jessica Denys ([[Captain (sports)|C]])
<li value=22>Cailie O'Hara

Germany
Head coach: Michael Behrmann

<li value=1>Kristina Reynolds (GK)
<li value=2>Victoria Wiedermann (GK)
<li value=3>Franziska Stern
<li value=4>Pia Eidmann
<li value=5>Lydia Morgenstern
<li value=6>Lina Geyer
<li value=8>Eileen Hoffmann
<li value=9>Stefanie Schneider
<li value=10>Nina Hasselmann
<li value=11>Jennifer Plass
<li value=12>Lena Arnold
<li value=13>Janne Müller-Wieland
<li value=14>Maike Stöckel ([[Captain (sports)|C]])
<li value=15>Silja Lorenzen
<li value=17>Lena Jacobi
<li value=18>Julia Karwatzky
<li value=19>Lea Loitsch
<li value=21>Julia Müller

India
Head coach: Maharaj Krishon Kaushik

<li value=1>Rajini Bala (GK)
<li value=2>Joydeep Kaur
<li value=3>Anjana Barla
<li value=5>Asunta Lakra
<li value=8>Saravjit Kaur
<li value=10>Sarita Lakra
<li value=12>Nisha Singh
<li value=13>Ranjita Thokchom
<li value=14>Rajwinder Kaur
<li value=17>Deepika Thakur ([[Captain (sports)|C]])
<li value=18>Jasjeet Kaur Handa
<li value=19>Amrita Kaur
<li value=21>Gagandeep Kaur
<li value=24>Saba Anjum
<li value=25>Chanchan Thokchom
<li value=26>Guddi Kumari (GK)
<li value=27>Ranjita Sanasam
<li value=30>Subhadra Pradhan

South Africa
Head coach: Jennifer King

<li value=1>Alana Richardson (GK)
<li value=2>Lenise Marais
<li value=3>Cindy Brown
<li value=4>Natasha Davidson
<li value=5>Kara-Lee Botha
<li value=6>Kathleen Taylor
<li value=7>Danielle Forword
<li value=8>Anika Fischer
<li value=9>Leslie-Ann George
<li value=10>Cindy Hack ([[Captain (sports)|C]])
<li value=12>Ilse Davids
<li value=13>Vida Ryan
<li value=14>Megan Robertson
<li value=15>Kim Hubach
<li value=17>Marcelle Keet
<li value=18>Leandri Steenkamp
<li value=25>Liesel Dorothy
<li value=26>Anna Botha (GK)

Pool C

Argentina
Head coach: Ernesto Morlan

<li value=1>Belén Succi (GK)
<li value=2>Daniela Domínguez
<li value=3>Lucía Pereyra
<li value=4>Noel Barrionuevo
<li value=5>Amalia Ceruttí
<li value=6>Pilar Mejíco
<li value=7>María Diez
<li value=8>Nadia Silva ([[Captain (sports)|C]])
<li value=9>Agustina Bouza
<li value=10>María Pallitto
<li value=11>Carla Rebecchi
<li value=12>Silvina D'Elía
<li value=13>Gabriela Aguirre
<li value=14>Yanina García
<li value=15>Giselle Kañevsky
<li value=16>Inés Garmendia
<li value=17>Rosario Luchetti
<li value=18>María Muto (GK)

Belarus
Head coach: Samvel Kahramanian

<li value=1>Tatiana Fedchenka ([[Captain (sports)|C]]) (GK)
<li value=2>Maryia Halinouskaya
<li value=3>Alena Yanubayeva
<li value=4>Hanna Zabrotskaya
<li value=5>Olga Tarshchyk
<li value=6>Liudmila Dabrylka
<li value=7>Hanna Lupach
<li value=8>Natalia Varabyova
<li value=9>Ryta Zhylianina
<li value=10>Yulia Piatrova
<li value=11>Nastassia Shcharbakova
<li value=12>Sviatlana Bahushevich
<li value=13>Yuliya Mikheichyk
<li value=14>Krestina Kulinkovich
<li value=15>Alena Chadayeva
<li value=16>Alena Alshevskaya

Scotland
Head coach: Keith Joss

<li value=1>Catherine Rae (GK)
<li value=2>Claire Ritchie (GK)
<li value=3>Nikki Kidd
<li value=4>Clare Scott
<li value=5>Kim Christison
<li value=6>Lee Pendreigh
<li value=7>Katie Mackay
<li value=8>Catriona Ralph
<li value=9>Kirsty Nolan
<li value=10>Holly Cram ([[Captain (sports)|C]])
<li value=11>Aimee Clark
<li value=12>Alison Bell
<li value=13>Nicole Scott
<li value=14>Leigh Fawcett
<li value=15>Susan Hamilton
<li value=16>Laura Wrightson
<li value=18>Aisling Coyle
<li value=21>Kim MacGregor

South Korea
Head coach: Park Shin-Heum

<li value=1>Oh Jin-Kyung (GK)
<li value=2>Kim Kyung-A
<li value=3>Park Young-Soon
<li value=4>Cha Se-Na
<li value=5>Han Hye-Lyoung
<li value=6>Choi Eun-Young
<li value=7>Kim Jin-Ju
<li value=8>Jeong Jin-Ok ([[Captain (sports)|C]])
<li value=9>Eum Mi-Young
<li value=10>Park Mi-Hyun
<li value=11>Kim Bo-Mi
<li value=12>Han Tae-Jeong
<li value=13>Kim Da-Rae
<li value=14>Im Mi-Ra
<li value=15>Seo Hye-Jin
<li value=16>Eo Young-Jin (GK)
<li value=17>Kim Young-Ran
<li value=18>Kim Jong-Eun

Pool D

Australia
Head coach: Neil Hawgood

<li value=1>Kary Chau
<li value=2>Fiona Boyce
<li value=3>Jane Bennett  ([[Captain (sports)|C]])
<li value=4>Madonna Blyth
<li value=5>Jade Close
<li value=7>Kathryn Hubble (GK)
<li value=8>Susannah Harris
<li value=9>Shelly Liddelow
<li value=10>Amy Korner
<li value=11>Rheannin Kelly
<li value=12>Rachael Lynch (GK)
<li value=13>Kobie McGurk
<li value=14>Casey Eastham
<li value=15>Lisa Pamenter
<li value=16>Emma Paterson
<li value=17>Jayde Taylor
<li value=18>Jacklyn McRae
<li value=19>Kate Hollywood

Chile
Head coach: Alfredo Castro

<li value=1>Constanza Abud (GK)
<li value=2>Sofía Walbaum
<li value=3>Andrea Sánchez
<li value=4>Alexandra Sclabos
<li value=5>Catalina Thiermann
<li value=6>Francisca Pizarro
<li value=7>Denise Infante
<li value=8>Carolina García ([[Captain (sports)|C]])
<li value=9>Camila Infante
<li value=10>María Fernández
<li value=11>Beatriz Albertz
<li value=12>Claudia Schüler (GK)
<li value=13>Veronica Bosch
<li value=14>Cristina Wagner
<li value=15>Daniela Caram
<li value=16>Fernanda Carvajal
<li value=17>Pilar Donoso
<li value=18>Francisca Flores

China
Head coach: Jin Jlanmin

<li value=1>Du Wei (GK)
<li value=3>Li Boyan
<li value=4>Zhang Yan
<li value=5>Wang Ying
<li value=6>Hu Pan
<li value=7>Sun Sinan ([[Captain (sports)|C]])
<li value=8>Li Xiaoning
<li value=9>Luan Haiyan
<li value=10>Wang Mengyu
<li value=11>Wang Mengyu
<li value=12>Fu Yu
<li value=14>Zhao Lixin
<li value=15>Zhang Yudiao
<li value=18>Li Ji ([[Captain (sports)|C]])

Spain
Head coach: Angel Laso

<li value=1>María López (GK)
<li value=2>Julia Menéndez
<li value=3>Rocío Ybarra
<li value=4>Gemma Bernad
<li value=5>Marta Ejarque
<li value=6>Marta Fàbregas
<li value=7>Sara Pérez
<li value=8>Olalla Piniero 
<li value=9>María Romagosa
<li value=10>María Gómez
<li value=11>Barbara Malda
<li value=12>Rocío Gutíerrez
<li value=13>María Contardí
<li value=15>Paula Dabanch
<li value=17>Gloria Comerma
<li value=18>Sumi Aoki
<li value=19>Margallo Leyre (GK)
<li value=21>Esther Termens ([[Captain (sports)|C]])

References

Women's Hockey Junior World Cup squads
Squads